Kateřina Janatová (born 13 March 1997) is a Czech cross-country skier. She competed in the  Women's 10 kilometre classical, and Women's sprint, and 30 kilometre freestyle, at the 2022 Winter Olympics. She competed at the 2021–22 FIS Cross-Country World Cup.

Cross-country skiing results
All results are sourced from the International Ski Federation (FIS).

Olympic Games

World Championships

World Cup

Season standings

References

External links 

1997 births
Living people
Czech female cross-country skiers
Cross-country skiers at the 2022 Winter Olympics
Olympic cross-country skiers of the Czech Republic
People from Jilemnice
Sportspeople from the Liberec Region